Marshal Key (born 18 June 1932 in Dundee, Scotland) was a former professional ice hockey player who played in the Scottish National League and the British National League for the Dundee Tigers, Harringay Racers, Edinburgh Royals and the Paisley Pirates. He also played for the Great Britain national ice hockey team. He was inducted to the British Ice Hockey Hall of Fame in 2007.

Marshal Key's death was announced in Dundee local paper the Courier and Advertiser, on Tuesday 9 February 2016. He was 83.

References
British Ice Hockey Hall of Fame entry

1932 births
Living people
British Ice Hockey Hall of Fame inductees
Dundee Rockets players
Harringay Racers players
Sportspeople from Dundee
Scottish ice hockey centres
Expatriate ice hockey players in Switzerland
Scottish expatriate sportspeople in Switzerland
People educated at Morgan Academy
British expatriate ice hockey people